The 1998–99 Maryland Terrapins men's basketball team represented the University of Maryland in the 1998–1999 college basketball season as a member of the Atlantic Coast Conference (ACC). The team was led by head coach Gary Williams and played their home games at the Cole Field House. Ranked as high as #2 in the AP and Coaches' polls, the team finished 28–6, 13–3 in ACC play and lost in the semifinals of the ACC tournament to UNC. They received an at-large bid as a number 2 seed in the 1999 NCAA tournament, where they lost to St. John's in the Sweet Sixteen. Official highlights of the season can now be viewed online.

Pre-season

Accolades
Team
AP ranked Preseason #6 team.

Obinna Ekezie
Preseason All-American
Laron Profit
Preseason All-American

Roster

Season Recap
With nearly all of its starters returning and a #6 preseason ranking, the Maryland Terrapins men's basketball team began the 1998–99 season with high expectations for a successful season and a deep run in the NCAA tournament. In their opening game, the team broke its record for margin of victory in a 113–46 victory against Western Carolina (a record that would be broken six weeks later with a 75-point victory over North Texas ). The Terrapins also went 6–0 against nonconference opponents at home, increasing their nonconference home winning streak to 64, the longest in the country at the time.

The team participated in two preseason tournaments, winning both. They defeated AU-Puerto Rico, UCLA, and Pittsburgh in the Puerto Rico shootout, and Stanford and Depaul in the 4-team BB&T Classic. Their first loss of the season came in Lexington against Tubby Smith's #5 ranked Kentucky Wildcats.

In ACC play, the team outscored its opponents by an average of 17.4 points in victories while posting an overall home record of 13–1 (7–1), its lone home loss coming against Duke. The team would finish 2nd in the ACC regular season standings with a 13–3 record, Maryland's best run since the 1994–95 season. In the 1999 ACC Tournament, the Terrapins defeated Florida State before losing to North Carolina in the semifinals.

The Terrapins received a #2 seed in the South region on the NCAA tournament – the highest seed ever received by a Gary Williams team  – and breezed through their first two matches against Valparaiso and Creighton. However, in the regional semifinals, the team struggled against #3 seed St. Johns, ending the first half of the game in a nearly eight-minute scoring drought. Maryland lost 76–62 and once again failed to advance past the Sweet Sixteen.

Accolades
Steve Francis
2nd Team All-American
Naismith and Wooden Award Finalist
1st Team All-ACC
ACC All-Tournament Team

Terrence Morris
Honorable Mention All-American
1st Team All-ACC

Laron Profit
Honorable Mention All-American

Lonny Baxter & Juan Dixon
ACC All-Freshmen Honorable Mention

Draft

Schedule 

|-
!colspan=11| Exhibition

|-
!colspan=11| Regular season

|-
!colspan=11| ACC tournament

|-
!colspan=11| 1999 NCAA men's basketball tournament

Rankings

References

Maryland Terrapins men's basketball seasons
Maryland
Maryland
Maryland
Maryland